Elections to Nuneaton and Bedworth Borough Council were held on 10 June 2004. Half of the council was up for election and the Labour Party retained control of the council.

After the election, the composition of the council was

 Labour 22
 Conservative 11
 Liberal Democrat 1

Election results

Ward results

2004
2004 English local elections
2000s in Warwickshire